Jasenovac is a village and a municipality in Croatia, in the southern part of the Sisak-Moslavina County at the confluence of the river Una into Sava. In Croatian and  Serbian word "jasen" means ash tree and the name Jasenovac means "ashen, or made of ash tree".
During World War II, it was the site of the Jasenovac concentration camp.

Demographics
In 1991, the total population was 3,599, Croats made up 2,419 (67.21%), while Serbs were noticeable population with 911 (25.31%).
In 2001, the municipality's population was 2,391, composed of 2,179 (91%) Croats and 141 Serbs (5.90%).

In 2011, the total population was 1,997, with 1,807 (90.49%) Croats and 152 Serbs (7.61%).

The municipality of Jasenovac consists of 10 villages:

 Drenov Bok - 143
 Jasenovac - 780
 Košutarica - 282
 Krapje - 179
 Mlaka - 30
 Puska - 321
 Tanac - 167
 Trebež - 77
 Uštica - 214
 Višnjica Uštička - 198

Austro-Hungarian 1910 census

According to the last Austro-Hungarian 1910 census, municipality of Jasenovac had 8,773 inhabitants which were ethnically and religiously declared as follows:

Note: 1910 census was based on language and religion, without question about ethnicity. Croatian and Serbian language were presented as one language: Croatian or Serbian. Croat and Serb ethnicity here is based on religion. Roman Catholics and Eastern Catholics (also Protestants and Jews) which language was Croatian or Serbian are presented as Croats, and Eastern Orthodox which language was Croatian or Serbian are presented as Serbs. Other ethnic groups are presented based on their language. That time Ruthenians presented together modern days ethnicities of Ukrainians and Rusyns. Jews were presented only as religious group.

History
The Ottomans conquered Jasenovac in 1536 and that is the first mentioned of the little town Jasenovac.

In the late 19th and early 20th century, Jasenovac was part of the Požega County of the Kingdom of Croatia and Slavonia.

Jasenovac attained tragic notoriety during the Holocaust through the Jasenovac concentration camp giving its name to the Ustaša complex of WWII concentration camps.

During the Croatian War of Independence, in 1991, Serb forces destroyed the local three-way bridge over the Una and the Sava linking the town to Bosnia and Herzegovina. The area was subsequently mined. During the retreat of 1st Krajina Corps in 1992 from area of Jasenovac looting and burning of Serb houses was recorded and this problem was discussed by regional council of SAO Western Slavonia. While in May 1993 Government of Republic of Serbian Krajina was informed by the local residents that 18 corps of Serbian Army of Krajina which are located in Jasenovac continue with burning of the houses, also they destroyed buildings and documentation of Jasenovac concentration camp.  The town was taken over by Croatian forces as part of Operation Flash on 1 May 1995.

In 2005, a new three-way bridge was opened with financing from Croatia and the European Commission. Demining operations in the area were ongoing in 2009.

Jasenovac is underdeveloped municipality which is statistically classified as the First Category Area of Special State Concern by the Government of Croatia.

Culture
Jasenovac is home to a library with over 10,000 items. Jasenovac celebrates May 1, the day of its liberation as part of Operation Flash, as its municipal holiday.

The village of Krapje in the Jasenovac municipality houses the headquarters of the Lonjsko Polje Nature Park: the largest protected wetland in Croatia.

Sport
The municipality is home to the football club NK Jasenovac.

References

External links
Jasenovac Municipality website

Populated places in Sisak-Moslavina County
Municipalities of Croatia
Slavonia
Bosnia and Herzegovina–Croatia border crossings